The Venezuelan Major League, officially the Major League of Professional Baseball ( or LMBP) is a professional baseball league in Venezuela. Unlike the top-level Venezuelan Professional Baseball League, which is played in the Major League Baseball offseason, the LMBP is played during the summer; it is the first summer baseball league in Venezuela since the Venezuelan Summer League ceased operations in 2015.

Current teams

Former teams
 Lanceros de La Guaira (2021)

Championship history

See also
Venezuelan Summer League

References

Baseball leagues in Venezuela
Sports leagues established in 2021
2021 establishments in Venezuela
Baseball leagues in South America
Latin American baseball leagues